The church of San Giovannino degli Scolopi is a minor church in the center of Florence, located on Via Martelli corner with Via Gori.

From 1351 to 1554, the church was known as San Giovanni Evangelista, since the site had a small oratory dedicated to the saint. In the mid-16th century, Cosimo I applied the inheritance of a Giovanni di Lando of the neighboring Gori family to the erection of a church for the newly arrived Jesuits (1577).  Construction began two years later on designs of Bartolommeo Ammannati, afterwards supplanted by Giulio Parigi and finally Alfonso Parigi il Giovane, who completed the work in 1661. The Jesuit Order was suppressed in 1775, and the church was passed to the Piarist or Scolopi Fathers. It was restored in 1843 by Leopoldo Pasqui.

The ceiling was frescoed (1665) by Agostino Veracini and stucco statuary designed by Camillo Caetani. It also has frescoes by Alessandro Fei (il Barbiere) and canvases by Jacopo Ligozzi, a St. Francis Saverio preaching to natives by Francesco Curradi, and a Christ and the Canaanite in the second chapel on left by  Alessandro Allori. Girolamo Macchietti painted a crucifix.

Works
Right chapels
First Crucifixion  by  Girolamo Macchietti, poorly visible frescoes by Domenico Cresti, il Passignano.
Second: St. Pompilio (1936) di A. del Zardo and lunette  by Pier Dandini.
Third: St. Niccolò  by  Domenico Campiglia and two ovals  by Agostino Veracini.
Fourth: Francesco Saverio  by Francesco Curradi, pictures by Anton Domenico Bamberini and stucco by Girolamo Ticciati; here are kept the relics of San Fiorenzo, died  in 303

Left chapels:
First: Angels, Jacob's ladder, Defeat of Lucifer  by Jacopo Ligozzi
Second (chapel of San Bartolomeo): Christ and the Cannanite by Alessandro Allori, ovals by unknown author.
Third: San Giuseppe Calasanzio di Antonio Franchi, Lateral frescoes unknown author.
fourth: St. Ignatius of Loyola by Antonio Puglieschi, ovals by Domenico Banberini.
In the college are found canvases of Sant'Elena by Tommaso Bizzelli, Immaculate Conception  by  Domenico Curradi and a St. Jerome by Jacopo Ligozzi.

Further reading

Gauvin Alexander Bailey. "The Florentine Reformers and the Original Painting Cycle of the Church of S. Giovannino". In Thomas Lucas (ed.), Spirit, Style, and Story, 135–80. Chicago: Loyola Chicago Press, 2003.

External links

Itinerary of faith in Tuscany

Roman Catholic churches completed in 1661
17th-century Roman Catholic church buildings in Italy
Roman Catholic churches in Florence
1661 establishments in the Grand Duchy of Tuscany
Baroque architecture in Florence
1661 establishments in Italy